Reza Mahalleh may refer to:
 Reza Mahalleh, Rudsar, Gilan Province
 Reza Mahalleh, Kelachay, Rudsar County, Gilan Province
 Reza Mahalleh, Mazandaran
 Reza Mahalleh Rural District, in Gilan Province